Francis "Frank" T. McDonough (April 2, 1846 – June 2, 1904) was a member of the Wisconsin State Assembly and the Wisconsin State Senate.

Biography
McDonough was born on April 2, 1846 in what is now Ingersoll, Ontario. In 1863, he moved to Eau Claire, Wisconsin. On September 28, 1866, McDonough married Jennie Horan. They had five children. McDonough was a member of Order of the Catholic Knights of Wisconsin, the Knights of Pythias and the Benevolent and Protective Order of Elks. After suffering from severe illness while visiting the Pacific coast, he died on June 2, 1904.

Career
McDonough was elected to the Assembly in 1892. Later, he represented the 24th District in the Senate. In addition, McDonough was an alderman and member of the school board of Eau Claire. He was a Republican.

References

External links
 

People from Ingersoll, Ontario
Pre-Confederation Ontario people
Politicians from Eau Claire, Wisconsin
20th-century Roman Catholics
Republican Party Wisconsin state senators
Republican Party members of the Wisconsin State Assembly
Wisconsin city council members
School board members in Wisconsin
1846 births
1904 deaths
19th-century American politicians